Yuriy Vasylyovych Hritsyna (born 15 June 1971) is a Ukrainian professional football coach and a former player.

Club career
He made his professional debut in the Soviet First League in 1988 for FC Zarya Voroshilovgrad.

Honours
 Ukrainian Premier League champion: 1993, 1994.
 Ukrainian Premier League runner-up: 1992.
 Ukrainian Cup winner: 1993.
 Lithuanian A Lyga champion: 2000.

European club competitions
 European Cup 1991–92 with FC Dynamo Kyiv: 7 games, 1 goal.
 UEFA Cup 1992–93 with FC Dynamo Kyiv: 2 games.
 UEFA Champions League 1993–94 with FC Dynamo Kyiv: 1 game.
 UEFA Champions League 2000–01 with FBK Kaunas: 2 games.
 UEFA Cup 2003–04 with FK Liepājas Metalurgs: 1 game.

References

1971 births
Living people
People from Sievierodonetsk
Ukrainian footballers
Association football defenders
Ukraine international footballers
FC Dnipro Cherkasy players
FC Zorya Luhansk players
FC Dynamo Kyiv players
FC Tyumen players
FC Elista players
FBK Kaunas footballers
FC Chernomorets Novorossiysk players
FK Liepājas Metalurgs players
FC Dynamo Stavropol players
FC Sokol Saratov players
FC Daugava players
FC Volga Nizhny Novgorod players
Ukrainian Premier League players
Russian Premier League players
FC Arsenal Tula players
Sportspeople from Luhansk Oblast